Moravian cuisine (Czech: Moravská kuchyně, German: Mährische Küche, Polish: Kuchnia morawska) encompasses the cooking styles, traditions and recipes associated with Moravia, a region of the Czech Republic (eastern part) and historically belongs to the Moravia, former historical country in Central Europe. Today, it is often perceived as an integral part of Czech cuisine, to which it has over the last century been artificially accommodated and mixed. Nevertheless, there is a large list of dishes, drinks and customs that are original only for Moravia.

Moravian cuisine includes many pork and poultry meat and knödel dishes (koláčky, gulivary, pěry), and often uses flour, in the south many vegetables and fruits such as plums.

Character 
Moravian cuisine makes much use of pork meat (in Moravian Wallachia also lamb), goose and duck meat and wild game (hares, partridges and pheasants). Lard (sádlo), goose fat (husí sádlo) and duck fat (kachní sádlo), beechnut oil and grape oil were mainly used as dish grease; butter was historically expensive and rare, and olive oil was imported. Especially in the heavily populated south, there was an abundance of vegetables, particularly white cabbage, red cabbage, peppers (paprika), Savoy cabbage, cucumbers, beans, peas, cauliflower, rutabaga, celeriac, beetroot, kale, lentils, and pumpkin. In the heavily populated southern part of Moravia there are vineyards, and wine and related products are used in the kitchen: grape oil, wine jelly, jam and powidl (prune butter), wine vinegar, raisins, and brandy. Moravia has more fruit orchards than Bohemia. Its most abundant fruits are apricots, peaches, plums and almonds. In southern Moravia there are also watermelons, figs and mulberries.

Spices and herbs 
The dominant spices are caraway, marjoram, onion (the local variety), garlic (the local variety), and to a lesser extent also thyme, parsley, rosemary, saffron, ramson/wild garlic/bear's garlic, satureja, garden cress, mugwort, and chives, which have been planted and cultivated for many centuries (they were originally Mediterranean herbs).

History 
Street markets played an important role in the development of Moravian cuisine, for example the cabbage market (Zelný trh) in Brno, which has existed for 850 years.

List of Moravian dishes
 Stuffed peppers (paprica)
 Moravian sparrow (moravský vrabec)
 Halušky (together with Slovakia)
 Olomoucké tvarůžky 
 Šulánky s makem, Mohnnudel (poppy seed noodles)
 Kyselica (zelňačka - zelná polévka/sauerkraut soup)
 Marillenknödl (meruňkové knedlíky/marholové gulivary)
 Plum dumplings (švestkové knedlíky/trnkové koláčky)
 Stryky
 Pohančena
 Tlačenka
 Bigos together with Silesia and Poland
 Powidl

Drinks
 Slivovitz Plum brandy-Slivovica/trnkovica.
 Jablkovica, hruškovica, ringlovica, meruňkovica...(fruit spirits)
 Kofola
 Wine (Moravian muscat, Pálava...)
 Odndrášovka
 Hanácká kyselka
 ZON
 Vincentka (mineral water) 
 Bezovka (popular home made water) Elderflower cordial
 Šaratica (mineral water)
 Apple juice (jablečný mošt)
 Burčák (low alcohol wine must) Federweisser

See also

 Czech wine
 Austrian cuisine
 Slovak cuisine
 Czech cuisine
 Hungarian cuisine
 Silesian cuisine
 Polish cuisine

References

Further reading 
 Martin, Pavel, Lahůdky moravské kuchyně. Prague, Agentura VPK (Novoplýnská 5, Prague) 2002. 
 Rohrer, R.M. (eds.), Die Mährische Köchin. Brno/Dresden, 1887/2018 (reprint). 
 Martin, Pavel,  Moravská kuchařka. Prague, Ivo Železný nakladatelství (Publishing) 2004.
 Anonymous, Moravian Recipes – From Past to Present.(Central Moravian Church, Bethlehlem, Pennsylvania) 1977. 
 Kloudová, Eva, Kuchařka moravských vinařek Prague, Petr Baštan Publishing, 2008. 
 Bartoš, František, Líšeň. Brno 1902
 Martin, Pavel, Moravské sladkosti. Prague VPK, Novomlýnská 5.

External links
 
Moravia